Sadie Jean Wilcox (born May 15, 2002) is an American singer-songwriter. Her debut single, "WYD Now?", went viral on TikTok in 2021.

Early life
Jean took piano lessons for six years, starting when she was in first grade, also taking vocal lessons. She also began writing songs in first grade. Jean was a part of her high school's choir.

Career
Jean was encouraged by her brother to make her music public after he heard her perform a cover of Radiohead's song "Creep", which prompted her to start posting her music to SoundCloud. In October 2021, Jean wrote the song "WYD Now?" with fellow New York University students Grace Enger and David Alexander Levya and posted a snippet of the song to TikTok the following day. In November 2021, she posted an "open verse challenge" for "WYD Now?" on TikTok, which went viral on the platform. "WYD Now?" was released as her debut single in December 2021. In February 2022, she released the music video for "WYD Now?", directed by Jaqueline Dufwa.

Personal life
As of 2022, Jean is a student at New York University's Clive Davis Institute of Recorded Music.

Discography

Singles

References

People from Tustin, California
Musicians from Orange County, California
Avex Group artists
21st-century American women singers
21st-century American singers
American women singer-songwriters
Singer-songwriters from California
American women pop singers
Living people
2002 births